This page shows the results of the Cycling Competition at the 1991 Pan American Games, held from March 11 to March 26, 1991 in Havana, Cuba. There were a total number of seven men's and four women's events.

Men's competition

Men's 1.000m Match Sprint (Track)

Men's 1.000m Time Trial (Track)

Men's 4.000m Points Race (Track)

Men's 4.000m Individual Pursuit (Track)

Men's 4.000m Team Pursuit (Track)

Men's Individual Race (Road, 164 km)

Men's Team Time Trial (Road)

Women's competition

Women's 1.000m Sprint (Track)

Women's 3.000m Individual Pursuit (Track)

Women's Individual Race (Road)

Women's Team Time Trial (Road)

Medal table

References
Results

Pan American
Events at the 1991 Pan American Games
1991
1991 in road cycling
1991 in track cycling
International cycle races hosted by Cuba